Arthur Armstrong Bell (20 February 1899 in Toronto, Ontario – 23 February 1963) was a Canadian rower who competed in the 1924 Summer Olympics. In 1924 he won the silver medal as crew member of the Canadian boat in the eights event.

References

External links
Arthur Bell's profile at databaseOlympics
Arthur Bells' profile at Sports Reference.com
Arthur Bell's grave

1899 births
1963 deaths
Rowers from Toronto
Canadian male rowers
Olympic rowers of Canada
Olympic silver medalists for Canada
Rowers at the 1924 Summer Olympics
Olympic medalists in rowing
Medalists at the 1924 Summer Olympics
20th-century Canadian people